Lohasar or Lohsar is a village panchayat located in Pathardi taluka in the Ahmednagar district of Maharashtra state, India.

The village covers an area of 1,114 hectares. As at 2011 the population was 2,017 (1,051 males and 966 females) in 379 households.

The native language of Lohasar is Marathi.

References

Villages in Ahmednagar district